The Mahadev Temple in Deobaloda is dedicated to Lord Shiva in the Indian state of Chhattisgarh. This temple belongs to the Kalchuri Period. The temple is a protected monument under the  Archaeological Survey of India. Temple witnesses high footfall during Mahashivratri when the devotees form nearby villages gather here for Lord Shiva’s blessing. The event is also accompanied by a small fair.

Overview

It is an ancient temple built by Kalchuris during the 13th century AD. It is said that this temple was built in just 6 months and that is why it is also called 6 Maashi (Maasi or Masi, in English - Months) temple. The temple is having a Kund and it is believed to be connected to another old town Arang of Chhattisgarh state through a tunnel

Architecture

The temple is east facing, built of sand stone. It has a Garbhagriha and a pillared Navaranga Mandapa(hall). The shikhara which is supposed to have been built in Nagara style is missing. The Garbhagriha houses a Shiva Linga of about 1.5 feet in height, which is approached through a highly ornate door entrance guarded by Shaiva Dwarpalas.Inside the garbhgriha one can find idols of Goddess Parvati, Ganesha and Hanuman among others. The mandapa pillars are adorned with images of Bhairava, Vishnu, Mahishasur mardini (a form of Devi Durga who killed the demon Mahishasura), shiva, musicians, dancers and Kirtimukha designs. The exterior of the temple near the entrance is adorned with decorated band of Gaja, Asva and Nara. The temple wall portion has two decorated segments adorned with images of Tripurantaka Siva, Gajantaka Siva, Narasimha, Radha Krishna, Ganesh, Varaha, Lakshmi along with other depictions of Gods and Goddesses. One can find pictorial representation of hunting, hunters and bull fighting on the walls of temple.

A nandi is placed in front of the temple, as if it is guarding it.
The Temple courtyard has a store house like shed where one can see antique idols and statues that have been found during excavation, which may have belonged to the temple.

Legend

It is believed that the sculptor who was building the temple got so much engrossed in his work that he didn’t care about his clothes. He became naked while continuing to work day and night to complete the temple. 
His wife used to bring food for him, but one day his sister came. Seeing this they both got ashamed and to hide himself he jumped in the Kund(holy pond inside the temple complex) near to the temple from the rooftop. Seeing this his sister also jumped in the nearby pond. Both pond and kund exist till date. The pond is called Kasara Talab because the sister was believed to be carrying the Kalasha for water.
A Kalash Type stone is still present there. 

The locals believe there is a secret tunnel inside the Kund that leads to a temple in Arang. The sculptor when he jumped , found the tunnel and reached Aaang where he became a stone. At that place Bhanadeva temple is built.
The Kund is having 23 steps and 2 wells beside it. In one the flow of water is never stops.

Location

The Mahadev Temple is built in the small town of Deobaloda in Bhilai Charoda.It is well connected by train and road. 
By road: The temple is well connected by the National Highway by road, located 20 km from the capital Raipur city and about 15 km from Bhilai nagar. 
By train: Deobloda Charoda Railway station is located just near the temple, which serves as a stop for Local and Passenger trains.
By airport: The nearest airport is Swami Vivekananda Airport Raipur.

Gallery

See also
List of Hindu temples in India
List of Shiva temples in India

References

External Links 

Shiva temples in Chhattisgarh
Hindu temples in Durg district
Shiva temples
13th-century Hindu temples
Buildings and structures completed in the 13th century